SIIMA Award for Best Actor in a Negative Role – Telugu is presented by Vibri media group as part of its annual South Indian International Movie Awards, for the best acting done by an actor in a negative role in Telugu films. The award was first given in 2012 for films released in 2011.

Superlatives

Winners

Nominations 

 2011: Lakshmi Manchu – Anaganaga O Dheerudu
 Sonu Sood – Kandireega
 Abhimanyu Singh – Bejawada
 Pradeep Rawat – Mangala
 Kelly Dorjee – Badrinath
 2012: Sudeepa – Eega
 Nassar – Dhammu
 Abhimanyu Singh – Gabbar Singh
 Sonu Sood – Julai
 Prakash Raj – Businessman
 2013: Sampath Raj – Mirchi
 P. Ravi Shankar – Ramayya Vasthavayya
 Ashutosh Rana – Tadakha
 Pradeep Rawat – Naayak
 Shawar Ali – Iddarammayilatho
 2014: Jagapati Babu – Legend
 Sai Kumar – Yevadu
 Ravi Kishan – Race Gurram
 Rao Ramesh – Mukunda
 Chakravakam Madhu – Autonagar Surya
 2015: Rana Daggubati – Baahubali: The Beginning
 Mithun Chakraborthy – Gopala Gopala
 Prakash Raj – Temper
 Ravi Kishan – Kick 2
 Sampath Raj – Srimanthudu
 2016: Jagapathi Babu – Nannaku Prematho
 Aadhi – Sarrainodu
 Arvind Swamy – Dhruva
 Kabir Duhan Singh – Supreme
 Sharad Kelkar – Sardaar Gabbar Singh
 2017: Rana Daggubati – Baahubali 2: The Conclusion 
 Arjun Sarja – LIE
 Rao Ramesh – Duvvada Jagannadham
 Tarun Arora – Khaidi No. 150
 Vijay Varma – Middle Class Abbayi
 2018: Sarathkumar – Naa Peru Surya, Naa Illu India
 Jagapati Babu – Rangasthalam
 Jayaram – Bhaagamathie
 Kunal Kapoor – Devadas
 R. Madhavan – Savyasachi
 2019: Kartikeya Gummakonda – Nani's Gang Leader
 Jagapathi Babu – Maharshi
 Regina Cassandra – Evaru
 Vivek Oberoi – Vinaya Vidheya Rama
 Sonu Sood – Sita
2020: Samuthirakani – Ala Vaikunthapurramuloo
Prakash Raj – Sarileru Neekevvaru
Sunil – Colour Photo
Nani – V
Jisshu Sengupta – Bheeshma
2021: Srikanth – Akhanda
Vijay Sethupathi – Uppena
Samuthirakani – Krack
Sunil – Pushpa: The Rise
Siddharth – Maha Samudram

References 

South Indian International Movie Awards